State Route 152 (SR 152) is a state highway that runs southwest–to–northeast through portions of Toombs and Tattnall counties in the east-central part of the U.S. state of Georgia. It runs from Lyons to Cobbtown.

Route description
The route begins at an intersection with SR 292 in Lyons. It heads northeast to an intersection with SR 86, located southeast of Oak Park. It continues to the northeast until it meets its eastern terminus, an intersection with SR 23/SR 57/SR 121 in Cobbtown.

SR 152 is not part of the National Highway System, a system of routes determined to be the most important for the nation's economy, mobility and defense.

Major intersections

See also

References

External links

 Georgia Roads (Routes 141 - 160)
 Georgia State Route 152 on State-Ends.com

152
Transportation in Toombs County, Georgia
Transportation in Tattnall County, Georgia